Krasnoarmeysky (masculine), Krasnoarmeyskaya (feminine), or Krasnoarmeyskoye (neuter) is the name of several inhabited localities in Russia.

Republic of Adygea
As of 2010, one rural locality in the Republic of Adygea bears this name:
Krasnoarmeysky, Republic of Adygea, a khutor in Takhtamukaysky District

Altai Krai
As of 2010, two rural localities in Altai Krai bear this name:
Krasnoarmeysky, Nemetsky natsionalny District, Altai Krai, a settlement in Kusaksky Selsoviet of Nemetsky National District
Krasnoarmeysky, Pankrushikhinsky District, Altai Krai, a settlement in Zyatkovsky Selsoviet of Pankrushikhinsky District

Republic of Bashkortostan
As of 2010, one rural locality in the Republic of Bashkortostan bears this name:
Krasnoarmeyskaya, a village in Pervomaysky Selsoviet of Sterlitamaksky District

Chelyabinsk Oblast
As of 2010, one rural locality in Chelyabinsk Oblast bears this name:
Krasnoarmeysky, Chelyabinsk Oblast, a settlement in Kateninsky Selsoviet of Varnensky District

Chukotka Autonomous Okrug
As of 2010, one urban locality in Chukotka Autonomous Okrug bears this name:
Krasnoarmeysky, Chukotka Autonomous Okrug, an urban-type settlement in Chaunsky District

Chuvash Republic
As of 2010, one rural locality in the Chuvash Republic bears this name:
Krasnoarmeyskoye, Chuvash Republic, a selo in Krasnoarmeyskoye Rural Settlement of Krasnoarmeysky District

Republic of Dagestan
As of 2010, one rural locality in the Republic of Dagestan bears this name:
Krasnoarmeyskoye, Republic of Dagestan, a selo under the administrative jurisdiction of Kirovsky City District of the City of Makhachkala

Ivanovo Oblast
As of 2010, one rural locality in Ivanovo Oblast bears this name:
Krasnoarmeyskoye, Ivanovo Oblast, a selo in Shuysky District

Kabardino-Balkar Republic
As of 2010, one rural locality in the Kabardino-Balkar Republic bears this name:
Krasnoarmeyskoye, Kabardino-Balkar Republic, a selo in Tersky District

Kaliningrad Oblast
As of 2010, one rural locality in Kaliningrad Oblast bears this name:
Krasnoarmeyskoye, Kaliningrad Oblast, a settlement in Dolgorukovsky Rural Okrug of Bagrationovsky District

Krasnodar Krai
As of 2010, six rural localities in Krasnodar Krai bear this name:
Krasnoarmeysky, Kavkazsky District, Krasnodar Krai, a settlement in Mirskoy Rural Okrug of Kavkazsky District
Krasnoarmeysky, Novopokrovsky District, Krasnodar Krai, a settlement in Nezamayevsky Rural Okrug of Novopokrovsky District
Krasnoarmeysky, Temryuksky District, Krasnodar Krai, a settlement in Zaporozhsky Rural Okrug of Temryuksky District
Krasnoarmeysky, Novokorsunsky Rural Okrug, Timashyovsky District, Krasnodar Krai, a khutor in Novokorsunsky Rural Okrug of Timashyovsky District
Krasnoarmeysky, Poselkovy Rural Okrug, Timashyovsky District, Krasnodar Krai, a settlement in Poselkovy Rural Okrug of Timashyovsky District
Krasnoarmeyskoye, Krasnodar Krai, a selo in Kukharivsky Rural Okrug of Yeysky District

Leningrad Oblast
As of 2010, one rural locality in Leningrad Oblast bears this name:
Krasnoarmeyskoye, Leningrad Oblast, a logging depot settlement in Gromovskoye Settlement Municipal Formation of Priozersky District

Republic of Mordovia
As of 2010, one rural locality in the Republic of Mordovia bears this name:
Krasnoarmeysky, Republic of Mordovia, a settlement in Krasnoarmeysky Selsoviet of Torbeyevsky District

Oryol Oblast
As of 2010, one rural locality in Oryol Oblast bears this name:
Krasnoarmeysky, Oryol Oblast, a settlement in Malakhovo-Slobodskoy Selsoviet of Trosnyansky District

Primorsky Krai
As of 2010, one rural locality in Primorsky Krai bears this name:
Krasnoarmeysky, Primorsky Krai, a railway crossing loop under the administrative jurisdiction of Partizansk Town Under Krai Jurisdiction

Rostov Oblast
As of 2010, six rural localities in Rostov Oblast bear this name:
Krasnoarmeysky, Kagalnitsky District, Rostov Oblast, a khutor in Khomutovskoye Rural Settlement of Kagalnitsky District
Krasnoarmeysky, Novoselovskoye Rural Settlement, Martynovsky District, Rostov Oblast, a khutor in Novoselovskoye Rural Settlement of Martynovsky District
Krasnoarmeysky, Yuzhnenskoye Rural Settlement, Martynovsky District, Rostov Oblast, a settlement in Yuzhnenskoye Rural Settlement of Martynovsky District
Krasnoarmeysky, Orlovsky District, Rostov Oblast, a settlement in Krasnoarmeyskoye Rural Settlement of Orlovsky District
Krasnoarmeysky, Verkhnedonskoy District, Rostov Oblast, a khutor in Meshkovskoye Rural Settlement of Verkhnedonskoy District
Krasnoarmeysky, Zernogradsky District, Rostov Oblast, a khutor in Donskoye Rural Settlement of Zernogradsky District

Ryazan Oblast
As of 2010, one rural locality in Ryazan Oblast bears this name:
Krasnoarmeysky, Ryazan Oblast, a settlement in Aladyinsky Rural Okrug of Chuchkovsky District

Samara Oblast
As of 2010, one rural locality in Samara Oblast bears this name:
Krasnoarmeyskoye, Samara Oblast, a selo in Krasnoarmeysky District

Saratov Oblast
As of 2010, three rural localities in Saratov Oblast bear this name:
Krasnoarmeysky, Saratov Oblast, a settlement in Romanovsky District
Krasnoarmeyskoye, Engelssky District, Saratov Oblast, a selo in Engelssky District
Krasnoarmeyskoye, Kalininsky District, Saratov Oblast, a selo in Kalininsky District

Sverdlovsk Oblast
As of 2010, one rural locality in Sverdlovsk Oblast bears this name:
Krasnoarmeysky, Sverdlovsk Oblast, a settlement under the administrative jurisdiction of the Town of Asbest

Ulyanovsk Oblast
As of 2010, one rural locality in Ulyanovsk Oblast bears this name:
Krasnoarmeysky, Ulyanovsk Oblast, a settlement in Zelenoroshchinsky Rural Okrug of Ulyanovsky District

Volgograd Oblast
As of 2010, two rural localities in Volgograd Oblast bear this name:
Krasnoarmeysky, Kumylzhensky District, Volgograd Oblast, a khutor in Krasnoarmeysky Selsoviet of Kumylzhensky District
Krasnoarmeysky, Novonikolayevsky District, Volgograd Oblast, a settlement in Krasnoarmeysky Selsoviet of Novonikolayevsky District

Voronezh Oblast
As of 2010, one rural locality in Voronezh Oblast bears this name:
Krasnoarmeysky, Voronezh Oblast, a settlement under the administrative jurisdiction of Ertilskoye Urban Settlement of Ertilsky District

See also
Krasnoarmeysk (disambiguation)